Wu Xuezhou (September 20, 1902 – October 31, 1983) was a Chinese chemist. He was a member of the Chinese Academy of Sciences.

References 

1902 births
1983 deaths
Members of the Chinese Academy of Sciences